Vertongen may refer to:

Lee Vertongen (born 1975), New Zealand cyclist
Stampe et Vertongen, Belgian aircraft manufacturer

See also
Jan Vertonghen (born 1987), Belgian footballer